The Zira FK 2021-22 season was Zira's seventh Azerbaijan Premier League season, and eighth season in their history.

Season events
On 25 May, Zira announced the signing of Tamkin Khalilzade from Sabah. The following day, 26 May, Zira also announced the signing of Mehdi Jannatov from Sumgayit to a two-year contract.

On 1 June, Hajiagha Hajili extended his loan deal with Zira from Qarabağ for an additional year, whilst Davit Volkovi also signed a new one-year contract with Zira.

Three days later, 4 June, Aghabala Ramazanov also signed a new one-year contract with Zira.

On 26 June, Zira announced the signing of Ruslan Abishov from Sabah on a one-year contract.

On 2 July, Zira announced the season-long loan signing of Welves from Lviv, and the permanent signing of Anar Nazirov from Gabala to a one-year contract.

On 12 July, Zira announced that they had extended their loan deal with Lviv for Filipe Pachtmann for an additional season, with the option to sign Pachtmann to a three-year permanent contract.

On 16 July, Zira announced the signing of Mo Hamdaoui from De Graafschap to a two-year contract.

On 4 August, Zira announced the singing of Gjorgi Stoilov to a two-year contract from Akademija Pandev, with the option of an additional year.

On 12 August, Zira announced the signings of Ramin Ahmadov and Rustam Nuriyev from Zagatala and Samir Gurbanov from Kapaz. Ahmadov and Gurbanov signed four-year contracts, whilst Nuriyev signed a three year contract.

On 18 August, Zira announced the singing of Loris Brogno to a two-year contract from K Beerschot VA.

On 30 August, Zira announced the singing of Joshgun Diniyev to a two-year contract from Sabah.

On 9 February, Zira announced the signing of Rahil Mammadov on loan from Qarabağ for the remainder of the season, whilst Ahmed Isaiah joined on an 18-month contract from Sporting da Covilhã the following day.

Zira's match against Gabala on 13 March was postponed in the 65th minute due to weather conditions, with the remaining 25 minutes being played on 14 March at 12:30.

Squad

Out on loan

Transfers

In

Loans in

Out

Loans in

Released

Friendlies

Competitions

Overview

Premier League

Results summary

Results by round

Results

League table

Azerbaijan Cup

Final

Squad statistics

Appearances and goals

|-
|colspan="14"|Players away on loan:
|-
|colspan="14"|Players who left Zira during the season:

|}

Goal scorers

Clean sheets

Disciplinary record

References

Azerbaijani football clubs 2021–22 season